Brezen is a dispersed settlement in the Municipality of Vitanje in northeastern Slovenia. The area is part of the traditional region of Styria. It is now included with the rest of the municipality in the Savinja Statistical Region.

The local church is dedicated to Saint Anthony and belongs to the Parish of Vitanje. It has a 15th-century Late Gothic nave and sanctuary with 18th- and 19th-century additions.

References

External links
Brezen at Geopedia

Populated places in the Municipality of Vitanje